Cortinarius verecundus is a basidiomycete fungus of the genus Cortinarius native to New Caledonia, where it grows under Nothofagus.

See also

List of Cortinarius species

References

External links

verecundus
Fungi of New Caledonia
Fungi described in 1990
Taxa named by Egon Horak